Leioproctus is a genus in the plaster bee family Colletidae. Its members are primarily found in Australasia and temperate South America, and include the most common native bees in New Zealand.

Species 
It includes the following species:

Leioproctus abdominalis (Smith, 1879)
Leioproctus abdominis Michener, 1965
Leioproctus abnormis (Cockerell, 1916)
Leioproctus acaciae (Rayment, 1939)
Leioproctus advena (Smith, 1862)
Leioproctus albopilosus (Rayment, 1930)
Leioproctus albovittatus (Cockerell, 1929)
Leioproctus alienus (Smith, 1853)
Leioproctus alismatis (Ducke, 1908)
Leioproctus alleynae (Rayment, 1935)
Leioproctus alloeopus Maynard, 1991
Leioproctus amabilis (Smith, 1879)
Leioproctus andinus (Herbst, 1923)
Leioproctus antennatus (Smith, 1879)
Leioproctus anthracinus Michener, 1989
Leioproctus apicalis (Cockerell, 1921)
Leioproctus argentifrons (Smith, 1879)
Leioproctus arnauellus Michener, 1989
Leioproctus arnaui (Moure, 1949)
Leioproctus asper Maynard, 1997
Leioproctus atacama Toro, 1970
Leioproctus atronitens (Cockerell, 1914)
Leioproctus aurescens (Cockerell, 1921)
Leioproctus aurifrons (Smith, 1853)
Leioproctus australiensis (Dalla Torre, 1896)
Leioproctus bacchalis (Cockerell, 1914)
Leioproctus baeckeae (Rayment, 1948)
Leioproctus basirufus (Schrottky, 1920)
Leioproctus bathycyaneus Toro, 1973
Leioproctus bicellularis (Ducke, 1910)
Leioproctus bicristatus (Cockerell, 1929)
Leioproctus bigamicus (Strand, 1910)
Leioproctus bimaculatus (Smith, 1879)
Leioproctus bipectinatus (Smith, 1856)
Leioproctus boltoni Cockerell, 1904
Leioproctus boroniae (Cockerell, 1921)
Leioproctus brunerii (Ashmead, 1899)
Leioproctus caeruleotinctus (Cockerell, 1905)
Leioproctus caerulescens (Cockerell, 1929)
Leioproctus caerulescens (Spinola, 1851)
Leioproctus calcaratus Michener, 1965
Leioproctus callurus (Cockerell, 1914)
Leioproctus canutus Houston, 1990
Leioproctus capillatus (Rayment, 1935)
Leioproctus capito Houston, 1990
Leioproctus cardaleae Maynard, 1997
Leioproctus carinatifrons (Cockerell, 1929)
Leioproctus carinatulus (Cockerell, 1905)
Leioproctus carinatus (Smith, 1853)
Leioproctus castaneipes (Cockerell, 1914)
Leioproctus cearensis (Ducke, 1908)
Leioproctus chalcurus (Cockerell, 1921)
Leioproctus chalybeatus (Erichson, 1841)
Leioproctus chrysostomus (Cockerell, 1917)
Leioproctus cinereus (Smith, 1853)
Leioproctus clarki (Cockerell, 1929)
Leioproctus clarus (Rayment, 1935)
Leioproctus clypeatus (Cockerell, 1916)
Leioproctus colletellus (Cockerell, 1905)
Leioproctus coloratipes (Cockerell, 1933)
Leioproctus confusus Cockerell, 1904
Leioproctus conospermi Houston, 1989
Leioproctus contrarius Michener, 1965
Leioproctus crassipunctatus (Urban, 1995)
Leioproctus crenulatus Michener, 1965
Leioproctus cristariae (Jörgensen, 1912)
Leioproctus cristatus (Smith, 1853)
Leioproctus cupreus (Smith, 1853)
Leioproctus cyaneorufus (Cockerell, 1930)
Leioproctus cyanescens (Cockerell, 1929)
Leioproctus cyaneus (Cockerell, 1915)
Leioproctus cyanurus (Cockerell, 1914)
Leioproctus cygnellus (Cockerell, 1905)
Leioproctus davisi Maynard, 1994
Leioproctus decoloratus (Ducke, 1908)
Leioproctus delahozii Toro, 1973
Leioproctus deltivagus (Ogloblin, 1948)
Leioproctus dentatus (Rayment, 1931)
Leioproctus dentiger (Cockerell, 1910)
Leioproctus diodontus (Cockerell, 1929)
Leioproctus dolosus Michener, 1965
Leioproctus douglasiellus Michener, 1965
Leioproctus duplex Michener, 1989
Leioproctus echinodori (Melo, 1996)
Leioproctus elegans Smith, 1853
Leioproctus eraduensis (Cockerell, 1929)
Leioproctus eremites Houston, 1990
Leioproctus eremitulus Houston, 1990
Leioproctus erithrogaster Toro, 1970
Leioproctus erythropyga Maynard, 1997
Leioproctus eucalypti (Cockerell, 1916)
Leioproctus eugeniarum (Cockerell, 1912)
Leioproctus eulonchopriodes Michener, 1989
Leioproctus euphenax (Cockerell, 1913)
Leioproctus excubitor Houston, 1991
Leioproctus facialis (Cockerell, 1921)
Leioproctus fallax (Cockerell, 1921)
Leioproctus fasciatus (Schrottky, 1920)
Leioproctus fazii (Herbst, 1923)
Leioproctus ferrisi (Rayment, 1935)
Leioproctus ferrugineus (Moure, 1954)
Leioproctus festivus (Cockerell, 1929)
Leioproctus fiebrigi (Brèthes, 1909)
Leioproctus filamentosus (Rayment, 1959)
Leioproctus fimbriatinus (Cockerell, 1910)
Leioproctus fimbriatus Smith, 1879
Leioproctus finkei Michener, 1965
Leioproctus flavicornis (Spinola, 1851)
Leioproctus flavitarsus Toro, 1973
Leioproctus flavomaculatus (Cockerell, 1905)
Leioproctus flavorufus (Cockerell, 1905)
Leioproctus floccosus Maynard, 1992
Leioproctus franki (Friese, 1908)
Leioproctus frankiellus Michener, 1965
Leioproctus frenchi (Cockerell, 1929)
Leioproctus friesei (Jörgensen, 1912)
Leioproctus friesellus Michener, 1965
Leioproctus fucosus Michener, 1989
Leioproctus fulvescens (Smith, 1876)
Leioproctus fulvoniger Michener, 1989
Leioproctus fulvus (Moure & Urban, 1995)
Leioproctus fulvus (Smith, 1879)
Leioproctus gallipes (Cockerell, 1913)
Leioproctus guaritarus (Urban, 1995)
Leioproctus hackeri (Cockerell, 1918)
Leioproctus halictiformis (Smith, 1879)
Leioproctus hamatus Maynard, 1994
Leioproctus hardyi (Cockerell, 1929)
Leioproctus helichrysi (Cockerell, 1918)
Leioproctus helmsi (Cockerell, 1929)
Leioproctus herrerae Toro, 1968
Leioproctus heterodoxus (Cockerell, 1916)
Leioproctus hillieri (Cockerell, 1914)
Leioproctus hirtipes (Smith, 1878)
Leioproctus hobartensis (Cockerell, 1906)
Leioproctus huakiwi Donovan, 2007
Leioproctus hudsoni (Cockerell, 1925)
Leioproctus humerosus (Smith, 1879)
Leioproctus ibanezii (Ruiz, 1944)
Leioproctus ibex (Cockerell, 1914)
Leioproctus ichneumonoides (Cockerell, 1906)
Leioproctus idiotropoptera Packer, 2006
Leioproctus ignicolor Maynard, 1992
Leioproctus iheringi (Schrottky, 1910)
Leioproctus illawarraensis (Rayment, 1954)
Leioproctus imitator (Rayment, 1959)
Leioproctus imitatus Smith, 1853
Leioproctus impatellatus Michener, 1965
Leioproctus incanescens (Cockerell, 1913)
Leioproctus incomptus (Cockerell, 1921)
Leioproctus inconspicuus Michener, 1989
Leioproctus insularis (Cockerell, 1913)
Leioproctus irroratus (Smith, 1853)
Leioproctus isabelae (Urban, 1995)
Leioproctus jenseni (Friese, 1906)
Leioproctus joergenseni (Friese, 1908)
Leioproctus kalen Toro, 2000
Leioproctus kanapuu Donovan, 2007
Leioproctus keehua Donovan, 2007
Leioproctus kumarina Houston, 1990
Leioproctus labratus (Melo, 1996)
Leioproctus lanceolatus Houston, 1990
Leioproctus lanhami Michener, 1965
Leioproctus laticeps (Friese, 1906)
Leioproctus launcestonensis (Cockerell, 1914)
Leioproctus leaena (Vachal, 1909)
Leioproctus leai (Cockerell, 1913)
Leioproctus leucostomus (Cockerell, 1917)
Leioproctus longipalpus Houston, 1990
Leioproctus longipes (Jörgensen, 1912)
Leioproctus lucanus Houston, 1990
Leioproctus lucidicinctus Houston, 1990
Leioproctus lucidulus (Cockerell, 1933)
Leioproctus macmillani Houston, 1991
Leioproctus macrodontus (Rayment, 1935)
Leioproctus maculatus (Rayment, 1930)
Leioproctus malpighiacearum (Ducke, 1907)
Leioproctus maorium (Cockerell, 1913)
Leioproctus maritimus (Cockerell, 1936)
Leioproctus mas Michener, 1965
Leioproctus mastersi (Cockerell, 1929)
Leioproctus megachalceus (Cockerell, 1913)
Leioproctus megachalcoides Michener, 1965
Leioproctus megadontus (Cockerell, 1913)
Leioproctus melanocyaneus Toro, 1973
Leioproctus melanoproctus Michener, 1965
Leioproctus melanurus (Cockerell, 1917)
Leioproctus melbournensis (Cockerell, 1910)
Leioproctus metallescens (Cockerell, 1914)
Leioproctus metallicus (Smith, 1853)
Leioproctus microdontus (Cockerell, 1929)
Leioproctus microsomus Michener, 1965
Leioproctus mimulus (Cockerell, 1910)
Leioproctus minimus Michener, 1965
Leioproctus minor (Moure & Urban, 1995)
Leioproctus minutus (Cockerell, 1916)
Leioproctus missionica (Ogloblin, 1948)
Leioproctus moerens (Vachal, 1909)
Leioproctus moniliformis (Cockerell, 1916)
Leioproctus monticola (Cockerell, 1925)
Leioproctus morsus (Cockerell, 1907)
Leioproctus mourei Toro, 1968
Leioproctus mourellus Michener, 1989
Leioproctus nanus (Smith, 1879)
Leioproctus nasutus Houston, 1990
Leioproctus neotropicus (Friese, 1908)
Leioproctus nicholsoni (Cockerell, 1929)
Leioproctus nigrescens (Cockerell, 1929)
Leioproctus nigriceps (Friese, 1916)
Leioproctus nigrifrons Michener, 1965
Leioproctus nigritulus (Cockerell, 1916)
Leioproctus nigroclypeatus (Cockerell, 1910)
Leioproctus nigrofulvus (Cockerell, 1914)
Leioproctus nigropurpureus (Rayment, 1935)
Leioproctus nitidior (Moure, 1956)
Leioproctus nitidulus (Cockerell, 1916)
Leioproctus nomadiformis (Cockerell, 1921)
Leioproctus nomiaeformis (Cockerell, 1930)
Leioproctus nunui Donovan, 2007
Leioproctus obscuripennis (Cockerell, 1905)
Leioproctus obscurus (Smith, 1853)
Leioproctus opacior (Cockerell, 1936)
Leioproctus opaculus (Cockerell, 1929)
Leioproctus orientalis (Vachal, 1904)
Leioproctus ornatissimus (Cockerell, 1916)
Leioproctus otautahi Donovan, 2007
Leioproctus paahaumaa Donovan, 2007
Leioproctus pachyodontus (Cockerell, 1915)
Leioproctus pacificus Michener, 1965
Leioproctus pallidicinctus (Rayment, 1953)
Leioproctus pallidus (Moure & Urban, 1995)
Leioproctus pallidus (Cockerell, 1915)
Leioproctus palpalis (Ducke, 1908)
Leioproctus pampeanus (Urban, 1995)
Leioproctus pango Donovan, 2007
Leioproctus pappus Houston, 1989
Leioproctus paraguayensis (Schrottky, 1907)
Leioproctus pavonellus (Cockerell, 1929)
Leioproctus pekanui Donovan, 2007
Leioproctus penai Toro, 1970
Leioproctus perezi Toro, 1970
Leioproctus perfasciatus (Cockerell, 1906)
Leioproctus perminutus (Cockerell, 1929)
Leioproctus perpolitus (Cockerell, 1916)
Leioproctus persooniae (Rayment, 1950)
Leioproctus peruvianus (Cockerell, 1926)
Leioproctus phanerodontus (Cockerell, 1929)
Leioproctus pharcidodes (Moure, 1954)
Leioproctus phillipensis (Rayment, 1953)
Leioproctus philonesus (Cockerell, 1929)
Leioproctus platycephalus (Cockerell, 1912)
Leioproctus plaumanni Michener, 1989
Leioproctus plautus Maynard, 1991
Leioproctus plebeius (Cockerell, 1921)
Leioproctus plumosellus (Cockerell, 1905)
Leioproctus plumosus (Smith, 1853)
Leioproctus prolatus Maynard, 1994
Leioproctus providellus (Cockerell, 1905)
Leioproctus providus (Smith, 1879)
Leioproctus proximus (Rayment, 1935)
Leioproctus pruinosus Michener, 1989
Leioproctus pseudozonatus (Moure, 1954)
Leioproctus punctatus (Smith, 1853)
Leioproctus purpurascens (Cockerell, 1914)
Leioproctus purpureus (Smith, 1853)
Leioproctus pusillus (Cockerell, 1929)
Leioproctus raymenti Michener, 1965
Leioproctus rectangulatus (Cockerell, 1910)
Leioproctus recusus (Cockerell, 1921)
Leioproctus regalis (Cockerell, 1921)
Leioproctus rejectus (Cockerell, 1905)
Leioproctus rhodopus (Cockerell, 1914)
Leioproctus rhodurus Michener, 1965
Leioproctus roseoviridis (Cockerell, 1905)
Leioproctus rubellus (Smith, 1862)
Leioproctus ruber Toro, 1970
Leioproctus rubiginosus (Dalla Torre, 1896)
Leioproctus rubriventris (Friese, 1909)
Leioproctus rudis (Cockerell, 1906)
Leioproctus rudissimus (Cockerell, 1929)
Leioproctus ruficaudus Michener, 1965
Leioproctus ruficornis (Smith, 1879)
Leioproctus rufipennis (Cockerell, 1917)
Leioproctus rufipes (Cockerell, 1929)
Leioproctus rufiventris (Spinola, 1851)
Leioproctus rufoaeneus (Friese, 1924)
Leioproctus rugatus (Urban, 1995)
Leioproctus saltensis (Friese, 1908)
Leioproctus scitulus (Cockerell, 1921)
Leioproctus semicyaneus (Spinola, 1851)
Leioproctus semilautus (Cockerell, 1905)
Leioproctus semilucens (Cockerell, 1929)
Leioproctus semipurpureus (Cockerell, 1905)
Leioproctus semiviridis (Cockerell, 1930)
Leioproctus sexmaculatus (Cockerell, 1914)
Leioproctus seydi (Strand, 1910)
Leioproctus sigillatus (Cockerell, 1914)
Leioproctus similior Michener, 1965
Leioproctus simillimus (Smith, 1879)
Leioproctus simplicicrus Michener, 1989
Leioproctus simulator Michener, 1965
Leioproctus singularis (Rayment, 1935)
Leioproctus spathigerus Michener, 1989
Leioproctus speculiferus (Cockerell, 1921)
Leioproctus spegazzini (Jörgensen, 1912)
Leioproctus stewarti (Rayment, 1947)
Leioproctus stictus (Moure, 1954)
Leioproctus stilborhinus (Moure, 1954)
Leioproctus striatulus (Rayment, 1959)
Leioproctus subdentatus (Rayment, 1931)
Leioproctus subdolus (Cockerell, 1913)
Leioproctus subminutus (Rayment, 1934)
Leioproctus subpunctatus (Rayment, 1935)
Leioproctus subvigilans (Cockerell, 1914)
Leioproctus subviridis (Cockerell, 1915)
Leioproctus tarsalis (Rayment, 1959)
Leioproctus thornleighensis (Cockerell, 1906)
Leioproctus tomentosus Houston, 1989
Leioproctus tristis (Spinola, 1851)
Leioproctus tropicalis (Cockerell, 1929)
Leioproctus truncatulus (Cockerell, 1913)
Leioproctus tuberculatus (Cockerell, 1913)
Leioproctus unguidentatus Michener, 1965
Leioproctus velutinellus Michener, 1965
Leioproctus ventralis (Friese, 1924)
Leioproctus versicolor (Smith, 1853)
Leioproctus vestitus (Smith, 1876)
Leioproctus vigilans Smith, 1879
Leioproctus viridescens (Cockerell, 1929)
Leioproctus viridibasis (Cockerell, 1936)
Leioproctus viridicinctus (Cockerell, 1905)
Leioproctus vitifrons (Smith, 1879)
Leioproctus wagenknechti Toro, 1970
Leioproctus wagneri (Vachal, 1909)
Leioproctus wahlenbergiae Michener, 1965
Leioproctus waipounamu Donovan, 2007
Leioproctus waterhousei (Cockerell, 1905)
Leioproctus wilsoni (Rayment, 1930)
Leioproctus worsfoldi (Cockerell, 1906)
Leioproctus xanthosus Maynard, 1993
Leioproctus xanthozoster Maynard, 1997
Leioproctus zephyr Prendergast, 2022
Leioproctus zonatus (Moure, 1956)

See also

References

Colletidae
Bee genera
Hymenoptera of Oceania
Hymenoptera of South America
Taxa named by Frederick Smith (entomologist)